Mani C. Kappan (born 1956) is an Indian politician, film producer, film director and actor. He is the current Member of the Legislative Assembly (MLA) of the state of Kerala for the Pala constituency.

Mani C. Kappan defeated Jose Tom Pulikkunnel of UDF during by-election in September 2019. This seat was vacant after the death of K. M. Mani, former Kerala Finance Minister. He was also the State Treasurer of the Nationalist Congress Party and had been the Convener of its Overseas Cell. He is the current MLA of Pala constituency. He is also a former volleyball international who played along with volleyball player Jimmy George. He is the producer of Meleparambil Aanveedu, one of the highest grossing Malayalam films of the early 1990s. It made the list of "14 Greatest Malayalam Movies Ever" as compiled by Manorama News. He was also the producer and director of Mannar Mathai Speaking, a popular Malayalam movie. He acted in around 25 movies mainly as antagonists during the 1990s.

Kappan is the incumbent MLA from the Pala constituency. On all the earlier occasions he was defeated by K. M. Mani who had represented the seat from its inception in 1965. He is the son of a former Member of Parliament, Cherian J. Kappan, who was also a freedom fighter. Kappan is also a well-known figure in Malayalam cinema, having produced about ten films and acted in around two dozen films. He even has two films to his credit as a director including a bilingual film in Assamese and Bengali. He was also an international volleyball player in the eighties.

Pala Seat Controversy
The brawl over Pala Assembly seat, which began during the by-election last year and was rejuvenated once again with the unexpected entry of the Kerala Congress (M) into the Left Democratic Front, is furious despite denial by the LDF leadership. The Nationalist Congress Party's state leadership is also divided over the issue. And on 22 February 2021 he formed a new political party named Nationalist Congress Kerala, with Mani C. Kappan as the National President and Babu Karthikeyan as the National Vice
President. His party had won one seat in 2021 Kerala Legislative Assembly election. In the election he defeated Kerala Congress(M) Chairman Jose K. Mani by more than 15,000 votes. Jose K. Mani's father K.M. Mani had held the constituency for fifty years.

Filmography

Acting
 Kusruthikaatu (1995) as Ganga's Father 
 Mangalam Veettil Manaseswari Gupta (1995) as Govindankutty
 Man of the Match (1996) as Abdul Rahman 
 Yuvathurki (1996) as J.K.
 The Good Boys (1997)
 Aalibaabayum Aarara Kallanmaarum (1998) as A. T. Alexander 
 Friends (1999) as Cyriac
 Vaanchinathan (2001) as Mahesh Gupta
 Nagaravadhu (2001) as Thripati 
 Kusruthi (2004)
 Iruvattam Manavaatti (2005) as Bharathan 
 Borolar Ghor (2012) as Bankimchandra
 Kabadii

Producer
 Janam (1993)
 Meleparambil Aanveedu (1993)
Nandhini Oppol (1993)
Vardhakya Puranam (1993)
 CID Unnikrishnan B.A., B.Ed. (1994)
Mangalam Veettil Manaseswari Gupta (1995)
 Mannar Mathai Speaking (1995)
 Kusruthikaatu (1995)
 Man of the Match (1996)
 Nagaravadhu (2001)
Kabadi Kabadi (2008)
Borolar Ghor (2012)

Direction
 Mannar Mathai Speaking (1995)
 Borolar Ghor (2012)

Television career
 Dathuputhri (Mazhavil Manorama), Year: 2015
Chilluivilakku

References

External links

Mani C Kappan at MSI

Male actors in Malayalam cinema
Indian male film actors
Male actors from Kerala
Living people
20th-century Indian male actors
21st-century Indian male actors
People from Pala, Kerala
1956 births
Malayalam film producers
Malayalam film directors
Male actors in Malayalam television
Indian male television actors
Film producers from Kerala
20th-century Indian film directors
21st-century Indian film directors
Film directors from Kerala
Nationalist Congress Party politicians from Kerala
Kerala MLAs 2016–2021